Michael Mauldin may refer to:

Michael Mauldin (producer) (born 1953), former president of Columbia Records and father of Jermaine Dupri
Michael Loren Mauldin (born 1959), founder of Lycos search engine